Ri Ji-ye (born 18 December 1997) is a North Korean sport shooter.

She participated at the 2018 ISSF World Shooting Championships, winning a medal.

References

External links

Living people
1997 births
North Korean female sport shooters
ISSF pistol shooters